HMS London was a 90-gun second-rate ship of the line of the Royal Navy, launched on 24 May 1766 at Chatham Dockyard.

London was originally launched as a 90-gun ship, as was standard for second rates at the time, but was later increased to 98 guns when she had eight 12-pounders installed on her quarterdeck.

She was Sir Thomas Graves' flagship at the Battle of the Chesapeake in 1781.

French Revolutionary Wars
She participated in the Battle of Groix in 1795.

Next, London participated in an abortive invasion of Ferrol. The party went in and after a 15-minute fight captured the French privateer Guêpe, of Bordeaux and towed her out. She was of 300 tons burthen and had a flush deck. Pierced for 20 guns, she carried eighteen 9-pounders, and she and her crew of 161 men were under the command of Citizen Dupan. In the attack she lost 25 men killed, including Dupan, and 40 wounded. British casualties amounted to four killed, 23 wounded and one missing. In 1847 the Admiralty awarded the Naval General Service Medal with clasp "29 Aug. Boat Service 1800" to all surviving claimants from the action.

She was present at the Battle of Copenhagen in 1801, as part of Sir Hyde Parker's reserve fleet.

Napoleonic Wars

At the action of 13 March 1806, London captured the French ship of the line Marengo. In 1807, she helped escort the Portuguese royal family in its flight from Portugal to Brazil.

Fate

London was broken up in 1811.

Notes, citations, and references

Notes

Citations

References

 Lavery, Brian (2003) The Ship of the Line - Volume 1: The development of the battlefleet 1650-1850. Conway Maritime Press. .

External links
 

Ships of the line of the Royal Navy
London-class ships of the line
1766 ships